Cummingston railway station stood on the Burghead and Hopeman Branch of the Highland Railway and once served the small village of Cummingston, formerly Cummingstown, in the Scottish district of Moray (formerly Elginshire).

History
The Inverness and Aberdeen Junction Railway opened the original branch from Alves Junction to Burghead in 1862. In 1865 the line was taken over by the Highland Railway and work started on continuing the branch from Burghead to Hopeman via Cummingston, the extension opening on 10 October 1892.

Cummingston had closed as early as 1904 however the London, Midland and Scottish Railway took over the line itself in 1921, the last passenger train on the branch running on 12 September 1931. Services ran to Keith or to Inverness by changing at Alves.

Infrastructure
The short platform on the single track line had no passing loop but had a siding, signal box and signals, with a small shelter. It was reached by a path that ran from near the overbridge. Standing on the landward side of the line the station was opened to serve the village for residents and visitors. Nothing now remains of the station and the track has been lifted, however the route is in use as a cyclepath and original road overbridge still survives to the south of the station site.

References

External links
Video footage of Cummingston and Hopeman

Railway stations in Great Britain opened in 1892
Railway stations in Great Britain closed in 1904
Disused railway stations in Moray
Former Highland Railway stations